Seattle University College of Arts and Sciences in Seattle, Washington is the oldest undergraduate and graduate college affiliated with Seattle University. The College offers over 50 undergraduates majors, 37 undergraduates minors, 7 graduate degrees, and 3 post-graduate certificates to more than 2,000 students.

Location
Seattle University's  campus is located in the First Hill area of Seattle.

Casey Building
Home to the College of Arts and Sciences, the Casey Building is a five story building housing the college's administrative offices and a majority of the undergraduate and graduate departments. It features multiple meeting and conference rooms, the office of the Dean, and a five-floor glass atrium overlooking the gardens hidden behind the building.

Fine Arts Building
Overlooking the largest open lawn on the Seattle University campus, the Fine Arts Building houses the classrooms, administrative offices of the Art and Art History Department and the Performing Arts and Arts Leadership Department, as well as the department's Vachon Room: an open  performance space used for rehearsals, exhibits, live theater and other events of artistic expression. Adjacent to the Fine Arts Building, the recently remodeled Hunthaussen Hall also contains several learning spaces, a design studio and digital art lab.

Jeanne Marie & Rhoady Lee Center for the Arts
Seattle University opened The Jeanne Marie & Rhoady Lee Center on February 14, 2006. A performance and exhibition space on the corner of Twelfth Avenue and East Marion Street, the facility was designed for use by Seattle University students, Seattle artists, and the wider community.

The Center for the Arts houses a 150-seat flexible theater designed for drama, dance, and ensemble music. The Center also includes a scene shop, costume shop, prop room, green room, dressing room, and ticket booth.

Designed in conjunction with the managing and artistic directors of local theater and dance companies as well as with Seattle University faculty, the performance space is usable by a wide variety of visiting artists and resident companies. Both stage and seating are mobile and removable. The theater is equipped with lighting and sound technology operated from an elevated control booth. The exterior decor coordinates with the surrounding campus, while the lobby art gallery along Twelfth Avenue is another feature.

References

External links
 Seattle University College of Arts and Sciences

Seattle University colleges and schools
Jesuit universities and colleges in the United States
Catholic universities and colleges in Washington (state)
Universities and colleges in Seattle
Educational institutions established in 1891
1891 establishments in Washington (state)
Liberal arts colleges at universities in the United States